No Time to Explain is a platform action video game developed and published by tinyBuild. Designed by Tom Brien and Alex Nichiporchik, it is the successor to Brien's browser game, released on January 6, 2011. No Time to Explain has been released on Linux, Microsoft Windows, and OS X. A remastered version of the game, No Time to Explain Remastered, was released for Linux, Microsoft Windows, OS X, PlayStation 4, and Xbox One. A Wii U version was planned, but never released.

Plot 
The game follows an unnamed male protagonist as he chases his future self, who has been captured, through time for an unknown reason. Central to the game is a powerful laser gun received from the Future Protagonist that can be used as both a weapon and a means of propulsion. A running gag is that, just as a character is about to explain what's going on, they are interrupted, keeping the protagonist - and the player - in the dark.

The plot contains elements of time travel, the time paradox effect, and alternate time-lines. As the game continues, the characters and worlds get increasingly more absurd, including a world made entirely of desserts and a blank world that must be painted with "ink" (via the gun) to traverse. The player will also control several alternate versions of the protagonists, such as the football helmet wearing "Most Popular Guy in the World," who uses his shotgun to propel himself over large distances.

Eventually, the culprit behind the attacks is discovered: the protagonist's evil twin, who was released by accident while the protagonist was chasing his abducted selves. Once all the levels are completed, a round table of protagonists convenes to come up with a plan. The group misunderstands a brainstorm from the original protagonist and graft him and The Most Popular Guy in the World together into a composite being, giving the player the ability to use both types of guns. The plan somehow works, but moments before defeat, the evil twin goes back to the beginning of the game with Composite Guy in pursuit. The original protagonist is killed after the twin steals the laser gun, the twin is then pushed into the attacking monster he released, and after a few awkward moments of silence, the composite protagonist finally announces, "Video Games!" Then, the credits roll.

Gameplay 
The game is a 2D side-scroller, with most of the levels involving various means of propulsion. The main method is a laser gun worn as a jetpack that shoots a laser beam with a time limit. Many variations on this, such as a shotgun that launches the player at a great distance, or a slingshot effect that flings the player from wall to wall, are used at different levels.

Development 
No Time to Explain was a browser game created by Tom Brien and released on Newgrounds on January 6, 2011. It has currently garnered over 405,000 views at Newgrounds. After the success of No Time to Explain, Brien teamed up with Alex Nichiporchik to start work on a full version of the game.

Development on No Time to Explain began in February 2011. The game was initially announced for PC and Mac, and was released for Windows, Mac and Linux in August 2011, and on Steam in January 2013. The game differs from the original Flash game in that instead of being drawn, the levels are built out of blocks. On April 11, 2011, tinyBuild announced that they opened a Kickstarter account to collect funds to help support the project. In less than 24 hours, the $7,000 goal was met. The Kickstarter page has helped raised over $26,000 for the project with a notable contribution of $2,000 from Minecraft creator Markus Persson.

References

External links 
 
 

2011 video games
2015 video games
Crowdfunded video games
Indie video games
Kickstarter-funded video games
Linux games
MacOS games
Platform games
PlayStation 4 games
Side-scrolling video games
Steam Greenlight games
Video games with Steam Workshop support
Video games developed in the Netherlands
Windows games
Xbox One games
TinyBuild games
Single-player video games